Roy Winfield Engle (November 25, 1917 – July 7, 2005) was an American football and baseball player and coach. After completing a college football career at the University of Southern California (USC), he served as the head football coach at Santa Barbara College of the University of California—now known as the University of California, Santa Barbara—from 1949 to 1951, compiling a record of 14–14. He was also the head baseball coach at Santa Barbara from 1952 to 1952, tallying a mark of 30–25.

Engle also spent a summer in the Chicago Cubs and St. Louis Browns minor league program.

Head coaching record

College football

References

1917 births
2005 deaths
American football fullbacks
Baseball catchers
Saint Mary's Pre-Flight Air Devils football players
Tulsa Oilers (baseball) players
Tyler Trojans players
UC Santa Barbara Gauchos football coaches
UC Santa Barbara Gauchos baseball coaches
USC Trojans football coaches
USC Trojans football players
People from Sheldon, Iowa
Players of American football from Iowa